The WUSA Supplemental Player Draft, held before Women's United Soccer Association's initial 2001 season, distributed college players to the league's eight inaugural teams. The draft occurred on February 4, 2001.  This took place after each team had already been allocated three national team players, two foreign players and had each made 15 selections from the main draft held on December 10 and 11, 2000.

Round 1

Round 2

1. The Atlanta Beat had traded its second round pick in this draft to the San Diego Spirit for Kerry Gragg as the sixth round selection in the main draft.

Round 3

Round 4

1. Atlanta Beat got San Diego Spirit's fourth round pick as a result of the earlier trade involving Kerry Gragg.

Draft notes
The supplemental draft was preceded by a two-day tournament at Lockhart Stadium, Fort Lauderdale, Florida, sponsored by Umbro and intended to bring together the best seniors in college soccer.

It was intended that the supplemental draft would facilitate: "selection of players who just completed their college eligibility or who recently submitted their names into the draft pool". After it had taken place, each team had four additional players on a provisional roster of 24. This would be cut down to 20 before the season began.

Draft host Tony DiCicco reminded disappointed candidates who were not selected that each team would still hold open try-outs before their rosters were finalized: "the process is not over". He said that an agreement on WUSA's formal affiliation with the USL W-League and Women's Premier Soccer League was close.

See also

 List of top-division football clubs in CONCACAF countries
 List of professional sports teams in the United States and Canada
 List of WUSA drafts
 2001 WUSA season

References

External links
 Inaugural Supplemental WUSA Draft
 Footage on YouTube

2001
Draft